Himacerus is a genus of damsel bugs belonging to the family Nabidae, subfamily Nabinae.

Species
 Himacerus apterus (Fabricius, 1798) - tree damsel bug
 Himacerus boops (Schiødte, 1870)
 Himacerus dauricus (Kiritshenko, 1911)
 Himacerus major (A. Costa, 1842) - grey damsel bug
 Himacerus mirmicoides (O. Costa, 1834) - ant damsel bug

References
 BioLib
 Fauna Europaea

Nabidae
Cimicomorpha genera